Purton railway station was in operation on the Swindon to Gloucester line in Wiltshire, England, between 1841 and 1964.

The Cheltenham and Great Western Union Railway through Purton parish was opened in 1841 and was absorbed by the Great Western Railway in 1843. Purton station opened when services began in 1841, in the hamlet of Widham, about 700 metres north of Purton village at the bridge over the Purton-Cricklade road. British Railways closed the station in 1964 but the line remains open. The booking office building survives with a small part of its platform.

To the west of the station was a goods yard, and beyond it a private siding for a brickworks.

Originally laid as dual-track, British Rail reduced the line between Kemble and Swindon to single-track in 1968. Network Rail investigated the options for reinstating the second track, along with the estimated cost (see Golden Valley Line). In the 2011 Budget the Government announced that funding for the redoubling was to be provided and the works were completed in August 2014.

References

External links
Purton Station on navigable 1948 O.S. map

Disused railway stations in Wiltshire
Former Great Western Railway stations
Railway stations in Great Britain opened in 1841
Railway stations in Great Britain closed in 1964
Beeching closures in England